In mathematics, a change of variables is a basic technique used to simplify problems in which the original variables are replaced with functions of other variables. The intent is that when expressed in new variables, the problem may become simpler, or equivalent to a better understood problem.

Change of variables is an operation that is related to substitution. However these are different operations, as can be seen when considering differentiation (chain rule) or integration (integration by substitution).

A very simple example of a useful variable change can be seen in the problem of finding the roots of the sixth-degree polynomial:

Sixth-degree polynomial equations are generally impossible to solve in terms of radicals (see Abel–Ruffini theorem). This particular equation, however, may be written

(this is a simple case of a polynomial decomposition). Thus the equation may be simplified by defining a new variable . Substituting x by  into the polynomial gives

which is just a quadratic equation with the two solutions:

The solutions in terms of the original variable are obtained by substituting x3 back in for u, which gives

Then, assuming that one is interested only in real solutions, the solutions of the original equation are

Simple example
Consider the system of equations

(Source: 1991 AIME)

Solving this normally is not very difficult, but it may get a little tedious. Back-substituting the first ordered pair gives us , which gives the solution  Back-substituting the second ordered pair gives us , which gives no solutions.

Formal introduction

Other examples

Coordinate transformation
Some systems can be more easily solved when switching to polar coordinates. Consider for example the equation

This may be a potential energy function for some physical problem. If one does not immediately see a solution, one might try the substitution

 given by 

Note that if  runs outside a -length interval, for example, the map  is no longer bijective. Therefore,  should be limited to, for example .

Applying the inverse of  shows that this is equivalent to  while . Indeed, we see that for  the function vanishes, except for the origin.

Note that, had we allowed , the origin would also have been a solution, though it is not a solution to the original problem. The function is always positive (for ), hence the absolute values.

Differentiation

The chain rule is used to simplify complicated differentiation. For example, consider the problem of calculating the derivative

Let  with  Then:

Integration

Difficult integrals may often be evaluated by changing variables; this is enabled by the substitution rule and is analogous to the use of the chain rule above. Difficult integrals may also be solved by simplifying the integral using a change of variables given by the corresponding Jacobian matrix and determinant. Using the Jacobian determinant and the corresponding change of variable that it gives is the basis of coordinate systems such as polar, cylindrical, and spherical coordinate systems.

Change of variables formula in terms of Lebesgue measure 
The following theorem allows us to relate integrals with respect to Lebesgue measure to an equivalent integral with respect to the pullback measure under a parameterization G. The proof is due to approximations of the Jordan content.

If  or  then .

Pullback measure and transformation formula 
The change of variables formula for pullback measures is

.

Pushforward measure and transformation formula

The change of variables formula for pushforward measures is

.

As a corollary of the change of variables formula for Lebesgue measure, we have that

 Radon-Nikodym derivative of the pullback with respect to Lebesgue measure: 
 Radon-Nikodym derivative of the pushforward with respect to Lebesgue measure: 

From which we may obtain

 The change of variables formula for pullback measure: 
 The change of variables formula for pushforward measure:

Differential equations
Variable changes for differentiation and integration are taught in elementary calculus and the steps are rarely carried out in full.

The very broad use of variable changes is apparent when considering differential equations, where the independent variables may be changed using the chain rule or the dependent variables are changed resulting in some differentiation to be carried out. Exotic changes, such as the mingling of dependent and independent variables in point and contact transformations, can be very complicated but allow much freedom.

Very often, a general form for a change is substituted into a problem and parameters picked along the way to best simplify the problem.

Scaling and shifting
Probably the simplest change is the scaling and shifting of variables, that is replacing them with new variables that are "stretched" and "moved" by constant amounts. This is very common in practical applications to get physical parameters out of problems. For an nth order derivative, the change simply results in

where

This may be shown readily through the chain rule and linearity of differentiation. This change is very common in practical applications to get physical parameters out of problems, for example, the boundary value problem

describes parallel fluid flow between flat solid walls separated by a distance δ; μ is the viscosity and  the pressure gradient, both constants. By scaling the variables the problem becomes

where

Scaling is useful for many reasons. It simplifies analysis both by reducing the number of parameters and by simply making the problem neater. Proper scaling may normalize variables, that is make them have a sensible unitless range such as 0 to 1. Finally, if a problem mandates numeric solution, the fewer the parameters the fewer the number of computations.

Momentum vs. velocity
Consider a system of equations
 

for a given function .
The mass can be eliminated by the (trivial) substitution .
Under the substitution  the system becomes

Lagrangian mechanics

Given a force field , Newton's equations of motion are

Lagrange examined how these equations of motion change under an arbitrary substitution of variables , 

He found that the equations

are equivalent to Newton's equations for the function ,
where T is the kinetic, and V the potential energy.

In fact, when the substitution is chosen well (exploiting for example symmetries and constraints of the system) these equations are much easier to solve than Newton's equations in Cartesian coordinates.

See also
Change of variables (PDE)
Change of variables for probability densities
Substitution property of equality
Universal instantiation

References

Elementary algebra
Mathematical physics